Eversharp is an American brand of writing implements founded by Charles Rood Keeran in 1913 and marketed by Keeran & Co., based in Chicago. Keeran commercialised Eversharp mechanical pencils (manufactured by two companies, Heath and Wahl), then expanding to fountain pens when the company was acquired by the Wahl Adding Machine Co. in 1916 and it was named "Wahl-Eversharp". The company continued until 1957 when it was acquired by Parker Pen, which continued to use the Eversharp brand for a time.

Keeran is considered a pioneer maker of mechanical pencils, as the inventor of the first successful one.

History 
Charles Rood Keeran, a native of Bloomington, Illinois, had worked for the Bloomington Pickle Co. in his 20s. Around 1911 he partnered with J.F. Funk to manufacture White Crown Mason jar lids, though his attention soon turned mechanical pencils. Keeran's earliest patent on a pencil date to October 10, 1913. He was granted US patent 1,130,741 on March 9, 1915. The first production of Eversharp pencils were made in New Jersey by the "Heath Corporation", a prominent provider of high quality metalwork to the writing equipment industry. These pencils were test-marketed over the holiday season of 1913 at Wanamaker's in New York City. Keeran returned to Bloomington sometime in 1914 and established "Keeran & Co.", selling Heath-manufactured pencils. Those pencils had a .046 inch lead, which became the industry standard for thin mechanical pencil lead (although today the most popular sizes are 0.5 mm and 0.7 mm).

In October 1915, Keeran relocated operations in Chicago, then signing a contract with the "Wahl Adding Machine Company" of Chicago to manufacture Eversharp-branded pencils. In mid-November 1915 Wahl took control of Eversharp in exchange for a capital infusion of $20,000. At the end of 1916, Eversharp was wholly absorbed by Wahl through an exchange of stock. Keeran retained a small stake in the combined firm and held the position of sales manager, but by the end of 1917 Keeran had been squeezed out of the company.

The Eversharp pencil was a huge success. By 1921 over 12 million had been sold. The Eversharp allowed Wahl to become one of the leading manufacturers of both pencils and pens, its entry into the fountain pen business in 1917 also facilitated by Charles Keeran, through purchase of the Boston Fountain Pen Company. Somewhat confusingly, the Wahl Pen Company used the Wahl name for its pens and the Eversharp name for its pencils. At the end of the 1920s, however, the company renamed itself Wahl-Eversharp, and all products, pens and pencils alike, were marked accordingly. In 1941 the company renamed itself, this time as Eversharp. It remained a major player throughout the 1940s, but a series of missteps in its attempts to enter the then-new field of ballpoint pens hurt the company badly. In 1957 the Parker Pen Company acquired Wahl-Eversharp. The Eversharp name was used for a time, but within a few years the production of Eversharp pens and pencils had come to an end. However, accessories such as refills continued to be sold under the brand until 1999, when it was discontinued.

Beginning in 2004, Syd Saperstein in the United States and Emmanuel Caltagirone in Italy attempted to revive the Wahl-Eversharp brand, working independently at first, then joining efforts. In 2012, they acquired the rights to the original Wahl and Eversharp trademarks and revived the brand name as the new "Wahl-Eversharp Company", a wholly owned subsidiary of Pensbury Manor LLC, an Arizona corporation.

Today the company produces modern fountain pens based on original patented designs of both Wahl and Eversharp.

Patents 
   New and useful Improvements in Lead-Pencils  and #1151016, and #1153115

References

Bibliography 
 The pencil: a history of design and circumstance, by Henry Petroski, Knopf, 1992. , pp 265–270.

External links 
 Wahl-Eversharp website
 A gallery of company advertisements up to 50s

Pencil brands
Pen manufacturers
Manufacturing companies based in Chicago
Manufacturing companies established in 1913
1913 establishments in New Jersey